Vicente Sancho y Cobertores (5 April 1784 in Petrés, Valencia, Spain – 29 May 1860 in Madrid, Spain) was a Spanish politician and militant who served as Prime Minister of Spain and Minister of State in 1840 during the reign of Queen Isabella II.

References

Spanish Senate. Personal dossier of D. Vicente Sancho
http://dbe.rah.es/biografias/14873/vicente-sancho-cobertores

|-

|-

1784 births
1860 deaths
Prime Ministers of Spain
Foreign ministers of Spain
Progressive Party (Spain) politicians
Presidents of the Congress of Deputies (Spain)